Marija Popin (born 1947) is a medical doctor and former politician in Serbia. She served in the Assembly of Vojvodina from 2000 to 2004 as a member of New Democracy (Nova demokratija, ND), which changed its name to the Liberals of Serbia (Liberali Srbije, LS) in 2003.

Private career
Popin is a medical doctor based in Kula.

Politician
In early 2000, New Democracy joined the Democratic Opposition of Serbia (Demokratska opozicija Srbije, DOS), a broad and diverse coalition of parties opposed to Slobodan Milošević's administration. Popin was elected to the Vojvodina assembly in the 2000 provincial election as a DOS candidate, winning in Kula's second constituency seat. The DOS coalition won a landslide majority, and Popin served for the next four years as a supporter of the administration. She did not seek re-election at the provincial level in 2004.

She appeared in the thirty-seventh position on the Liberals of Serbia electoral list in the 2003 Serbian parliamentary election. The list did not cross the electoral threshold to win representation in the assembly.

Serbia introduced the direct election of mayors in the 2004 local elections. Popin ran as the LS candidate in Kula and was defeated in the first round of voting.

Electoral record

Local (Kula)

Provincial (Vojvodina)

References

1947 births
Living people
People from Kula, Serbia
Serbian women in politics
Members of the Assembly of Vojvodina
Liberals of Serbia politicians